Ajdin Muzaka (? - 1444) was the brother in law of George Kastrioti Skanderbeg and one of his commanders. He was converted to Islam and served in Ottoman army before joining Skanderbeg in 1443. He was the commander of the central group in the Battle of Torvioll and he played a crucial role in the Albanian victory. He was wounded in that battle and died soon afterwards. He was known for his extreme courage and was the first high-rank Albanian commander who died in Skanderbeg's battles against Ottoman forces.

References

Military personnel of the Ottoman Empire
Converts to Islam
1444 deaths
Year of birth unknown
Albanian military personnel
Ajdin
15th-century Albanian people